The Cabinet of New Zealand is the New Zealand Government's body of senior ministers, accountable to the New Zealand Parliament. Cabinet meetings, chaired by the prime minister, occur once a week; in them, vital issues are discussed and government policy is formulated. Cabinet is also composed of a number of committees focused on specific areas of governance and policy. Though not established by any statute, Cabinet has significant power in the New Zealand political system and nearly all bills proposed by Cabinet in Parliament are enacted.

The New Zealand Cabinet follows the traditions of the British cabinet system. Members of Cabinet are collectively responsible to Parliament for its actions and policies. Cabinet discussions are confidential and are not disclosed to the public apart from the announcement of decisions.

All ministers in Cabinet also serve as members of the Executive Council, the body tasked with advising the governor-general in the exercise of his or her formal constitutional functions. Outside Cabinet, there are a number of non-Cabinet ministers, responsible for a specific policy area and reporting directly to a senior Cabinet minister. Ministers outside Cabinet are also part of Cabinet committees and will regularly attend Cabinet meetings which concern their s. Therefore, although operating outside of Cabinet directly, these ministers do not lack power and influence as they are still very much part of the decision making process.

Constitutional basis 

Cabinet is not established by any statute or constitutional document but exists purely by long-established constitutional convention. This convention carries sufficient weight for many official declarations and regulations to refer to Cabinet, and a government department—the Department of the Prime Minister and Cabinet—is responsible for supporting it. Although Cabinet lacks any direct legislative framework for its existence, the Cabinet Manual has become the official document which governs its functions, and on which its convention rests.

The structure of Cabinet has as its basis the formal institution known as the Executive Council, the body tasked with advising the governor-general in the exercise of his or her formal constitutional functions (i.e. the "Governor-General in Council"). Most ministers hold membership of both bodies, but some executive councillors, known as "ministers outside Cabinet", are not ranked as Cabinet members and do not normally attend. The convention of a cabinet meeting separately from the Executive Council began during Edward Stafford's first tenure as premier (1856–1861). Stafford, a long-time advocate of responsible government in New Zealand, believed the colonial government should have full control over all its affairs, without the intervention of the governor. Because the governor chaired the Executive Council, Stafford intentionally met with his ministers without the governor present, thus reducing the Council to its formal role.

Powers and functions 

The lack of formal legislation establishing Cabinet leaves the powers of its members only loosely defined. Cabinet generally directs and controls policy (releasing government policy statements), and is responsible to the House of Representatives (the elected component of Parliament). It also has significant influence over law-making, and all draft government bills must be submitted to the Cabinet Legislation Committee before they can be introduced to the House. Convention regarding Cabinet's authority has considerable force, and generally proves strong enough to bind its participants. Theoretically, each minister operates independently, having received a ministerial warrant over a certain field from the Crown. But the governor-general can dismiss a minister at any time, conventionally on the advice of the prime minister, so ministers are largely obliged to work within a certain framework.

Collective responsibility 

Cabinet itself acts as the accepted forum for establishing this framework. Ministers will jointly discuss the policy which the government as a whole will pursue, and ministers who do not exercise their respective powers in a manner compatible with Cabinet's decision risk losing those powers. This has become known as the doctrine of collective responsibility. Collective responsibility is a constitutional convention which rests on three principles. The first principle is unanimity, where members of Cabinet must publicly support decisions and defend them in public, regardless of any personal views on the matter. Secondly, the confidentiality limb means that all Cabinet discussions are to be kept confidential. This allows for open and explicit conversation, discussion and debate on the issues Cabinet chooses to look at. The final principle is confidence, where Cabinet and executive government must have the confidence of the House of Representatives. If there is no government, the governor-general has the ability to intervene to find a government that does have confidence.

Formally all ministers are equals and may not command or be commanded by a fellow minister. Constitutional practice does, however, dictate that the prime minister is primus inter pares, meaning 'first among equals'.

Problems arise when the prime minister breaches collective responsibility. Since ministerial appointments and dismissals are in practice in the hands of the prime minister, Cabinet can not directly initiate any action against a prime minister who openly disagrees with their government's policy. On the other hand, a prime minister who tries to act against concerted opposition from their Cabinet risks losing the confidence of their party colleagues. An example is former Prime Minister David Lange, who publicly spoke against a tax reform package which was sponsored by then-Finance Minister Roger Douglas and supported by Cabinet. Douglas was forced to resign, but when the Cabinet supported Douglas against Lange, the Prime Minister interpreted this as a vote of no-confidence in his leadership and stepped down.

Collective responsibility after MMP 
Some political commentators, such as Professor Philip Joseph, have argued that it is a misnomer to deem the unanimity principle of collective responsibility a constitutional convention as such. Joseph views unanimity as merely a "rule of pragmatic politics", lacking a sufficient constitutional nature to be deemed a constitutional convention. He states that, unlike a convention, governments may waive, suspend or abandon political rules, as has happened since the introduction of the mixed-member proportional system (MMP) in 1993 (see ). One reform following the introduction of MMP allowed for junior parties in a coalition the ability to 'agree to disagree' with the majority in order to manage policy differences. Following the 2011 general election the National-led government released the following statement in regards to the role of minor parties in the context of collective responsibility:
Collective responsibility applies differently in the case of support party Ministers. Support party Ministers are only bound by collective responsibility in relation to their own respective portfolios (including any specific delegated responsibilities). When support party Ministers speak about the issues in their portfolios, they speak for the government and as part of the government. When the government takes decisions within their portfolios, they must support those decisions, regardless of their personal views and whether or not they were at the meeting concerned. When support party Ministers speak about matters outside their portfolios, they may speak as political party leaders or members of Parliament rather than as Ministers, and do not necessarily support the government position.

Ministers outside Cabinet retain individual ministerial responsibility for the actions of their department (in common with Cabinet ministers).

Electoral reform and Cabinet structure 

The 1993 electoral referendum in New Zealand resulted in a number of structural changes to Cabinet. The change to the MMP system ultimately led to a larger number of political parties in Parliament, as under the proportional representation system any political party can enter Parliament if they received five percent of the party vote or won one electorate seat. The increased representation resulted in the need to form coalitions between parties, as no single party received a majority of votes and seats under MMP until 2020.

In order to govern in a coalition under MMP, it is likely that a major party will have to relinquish and offer Cabinet positions to members of a minority party. The aftermath of the first MMP election in 1996 highlighted the changes resulting from the new proportional parliament. New Zealand First received 13.4% of the party vote, giving them 17 total seats in the House of Representatives (in contrast to 8.5% in the 1993 general election, conducted under the plurality voting system).

Negotiations forming the new government took nearly two months however the ultimate result being that New Zealand First were to have five ministers inside Cabinet and four outside. This translated to having 36.4% of representation in the new government. The Prime Minister following the 1996 election, Jim Bolger, was forced to tell his caucus during negotiations with New Zealand First, that he would not be able to satisfy all ambitions of the caucus, due to the forced inclusion of the minority party into the governmental framework, thus highlighting one of the challenges that came with MMP.

The result of MMP on Cabinet structure in New Zealand is also highlighted below under the  heading. In the coalition deal following the election New Zealand First leader Winston Peters was given the position of deputy prime minister, and New Zealand First were given a number of ministerial portfolios including foreign affairs, infrastructure, regional economic development, and internal affairs.

Meetings 

Members of Cabinet meet on a regular basis, usually weekly on a Monday, to discuss the most important issues of government policy. The meetings are chaired by the prime minister or, in the prime minister's absence, the next most senior minister in attendance, usually the deputy prime minister. Ministers outside Cabinet may occasionally be invited for the discussion of particular items with which they have been closely involved. All Cabinet meetings are held behind closed doors, and the minutes are taken by the Cabinet secretary and kept confidential. However, usually shortly after the weekly meeting the prime minister holds a press conference to discuss important national issues.

The Cabinet secretary and their deputy are the only non-ministers who attend Cabinet meetings. They are not political appointments and their role at Cabinet meetings is to formulate and record the Cabinet's decisions and advise on procedure, not to offer policy advice. The secretary has a dual role as the clerk of the Executive Council where they provide a channel of communication and liaison between the Cabinet and the governor-general.

The Cabinet room, where the weekly meetings are normally held, and related offices are located at the top of the Beehive (the Executive Wing of Parliament Buildings).

Members 

The prime minister assigns roles to ministers and ranks them in order to determine seniority. A minister's rank depends on factors such as "their length of service, the importance of their portfolio and their personal standing with the prime minister". The deputy prime minister is the second-highest ranked, after the prime minister. Under MMP, there are three categories of minister: ministers within the 'core' Cabinet, ministers outside Cabinet, and ministers from support parties (i.e. minor parties which have agreed to support a government party during confidence and supply votes). The size of Cabinet has grown over time. In the 1890s, for example, there were seven Cabinet ministers. The number of ministers within Cabinet increased in the period up until the 1970s, but has plateaued at 20 since ; this despite increases in the number of members of parliament. By contrast, the numbers of ministers outside Cabinet has grown, especially since the introduction of MMP.

All ministers are formally styled "The Honourable" (abbreviated to "The Hon."), except for the prime minister who is accorded the style "The Right Honourable" ("The Rt. Hon."). Formerly some other senior ministers used "The Right Honourable" by virtue of membership of the Privy Council of the United Kingdom, but appointments were discontinued in 2000.

List of current ministers 
The current ministry has a Cabinet of 20 ministers, all from the Labour Party. There are five Labour Party ministers outside Cabinet; and two support ministers from the Green Party, which has a 'cooperation agreement' with Labour. Additionally, there is one parliamentary under-secretary who assists the ministers from a parliamentary standpoint.

The table below lists all ministers, .

Committees 
A Cabinet committee comprises a subset of the larger Cabinet, consisting of a number of ministers who have responsibility in related areas of policy. Cabinet committees go into considerably more detail than can be achieved at regular Cabinet meetings, discussing issues which do not need the input of ministers holding unrelated portfolios. Committee terms of reference and membership are determined by the prime minister and the exact number and makeup of committees changes with the government. , there are 10 Cabinet committees:

 Cabinet Appointments and Honours Committee (APH)
 Cabinet Business Committee (CBC)
 Cabinet Priorities Committee (CPC)
 Cabinet Economic Development Committee (DEV)
 Cabinet Environment, Energy and Climate Committee (ENV)
 Cabinet External Relations and Security Committee (ERS)
 Cabinet Government Administration and Expenditure Review Committee (GOV)
 Cabinet Legislation Committee (LEG)
 Cabinet Māori Crown Relations: Te Arawhiti Committee (MCR)
 Cabinet Social Wellbeing Committee (SWC)

Cabinet committees will often discuss matters under delegated authority or directly referred to them by Cabinet, and then report back the results of their deliberation. This can sometimes become a powerful tool for advancing certain policies, as was demonstrated in the Lange government. Minister of Finance Roger Douglas and his allies succeeded in dominating the finance committee, enabling them to determine what it recommended to Cabinet. The official recommendation of the finance committee was much harder for his opponents to fight than his individual claims in Cabinet would be. Douglas was able to pass measures that, had Cabinet deliberated on them itself rather than pass them to committee, would have been defeated.

See also 
 Shadow Cabinet of New Zealand
 List of New Zealand governments
 :Category:Members of the Cabinet of New Zealand

Notes

References

External links 
 Cabinet Manual 2017 – DPMC

Government of New Zealand
Politics of New Zealand
Constitution of New Zealand
New Zealand, Cabinet Of